The San Manuel Copper Mine was a surface and underground porphyry copper mine located in San Manuel, Pinal County, Arizona.  Frank Schultz was the original discoverer, in 1879, but the main body of the deposits were discovered by Henry W. Nichols in 1942.  The exploration drilling went on from 1943 to 1948, with the first mine shaft built 1948.  Louis Lesser developed a mining city to service Nichols’ newly discovered deposits, and the development was completed about 1954.  The first major production began in 1955. The mine and smelter were permanently closed in 2003.

Geology
Faulting of the original ore body created two main segments, separated by an area of minor sulfides. The original ore body was cylindrical, but the San Manuel fault caused the division into two main parts, called the upper San Manuel ore body and the lower Kalamazoo ore body.

The mineralization is related to a Laramide monzonite porphyry stock and associated dikes which were intruded into existing Precambrian quartz monzonite body.  Mineralization occurs within the Laramide intrusive and in the surrounding Precambrian porphyry.

The Kalamazoo portion of the deposit was discovered by an exploration drilling program based on the missing portion of the presumed symmetrical hydrothermal alteration/mineralization pattern of the San Manuel portion of the deposit. Geologist J. D. Lowell who directed the program for Quintana Minerals Corporation and John M. Guilbert went on to develop this work into a general pattern for porphyry copper deposit exploration.

Operation
The mine was operated by the Magma Copper Company before being bought out by BHP, which ultimately closed it. Over 700,000,000 tons of ore were extracted using the block caving method. The operation of mining was divided into mining the hypogene sulfide mineralization (chalcopyrite) at depth and the shallow supergene (chalcocite) and oxidized deposit (chrysocolla, malachite, native copper and cuprite).

The entire site is now scheduled for reclamation.

See also
 San Manuel Arizona Railroad
 Copper Basin Railway

References

Technical reports
 Buchanan, John F. and Buchella, Frank H., “History and Development of the San Manuel Mine". A.I.M.E. Vol. 217, February 1960
 Chapman, T. L., “San Manuel copper deposit, Pinal Co., Arizona”, US Bureau of Mines Report of Investigation 4108, 1947
 Dale, V. B., “Mining, milling, and smelting methods”, San Manuel Copper Corp., Pinal County, Arizona: U.S. Bureau of Mines Information Circular I.C. 8104, 145 p., 1962
 Galbraith, F.W., 1947, “Minerals of Arizona”, Arizona Bureau of Mines Bulletin 153: 19, 1947
 Lovering, T. S., “Dispersion of copper from the San Manuel copper deposit, Pinal Co., Arizona”, Economic Geology: 45: 493–514, 1950
 Lovering, T. S., “Geothermal gradients, recent climate changes, and rate of sulphide oxidation in the San Manuel district, Arizona”, Economic Geology: 43: 1–20, (1948)
 Schwartz, G. M., “Hydrothermal alteration in the 'porphyry copper' deposits”, Economic Geology: 42: 319–352, 1947
 Schwartz. G. M., “Geology of the San Manuel copper deposit, Arizona”, USGS p 256, 1953
 Schwartz, G. M., “Oxidation and enrichment in the San Manuel copper deposit, Arizona”, Economic Geology: 44: 253–277, 1949

Books
 Tafoya, Onofre, Mother Magma, A Memoir of Underground Life in the San Manuel Copper Mine, Hispanic Institute of Social Issues, 2006 

Copper mines in Arizona
Buildings and structures in Pinal County, Arizona
Geography of Pinal County, Arizona